The Hafei Lobo (路宝) is a city car based on the Lubao (Lobo) design by Pininfarina produced by the Chinese manufacturer Hafei Motor from 2002 to 2010.

Overview
The chassis of the Hafei Lobo is sourced from British company Lotus. The design shares similarities with the 1999 Pininfarina Metrocubo concept.

In Russia, its name is Hafei Brio. In Sri Lanka, the car is marketed as Micro Trend by Micro Cars Limited. In Malaysia, the car is marketed as the Naza Sutera from Naza. In Thailand, Naza Sutera from Malaysia is marketed as Naza Forza.

The Hafei Lobo is available with the following two gasoline-powered engines:
 1.0 -DA465Q-2- 8V   (Euro II)
 1.1 -DA468Q- 16V 

A facelift was introduced for the 2010 model year of the Lobo, and another minor update in 2011 with the actual model being launched in 2012. The facelifted Lobo features a restyled front fascia heavily resembling the second generation Toyota Yaris hatchback, and production ended after the 2011 model year. 
Safety: the hafei lobo drove at 20 miles and crashed safely.

References

External links
Hafei (en)
Hafei (cn)
Micro Cars Limited

City cars
Cars of China
Pininfarina
2010s cars
Hatchbacks
Front-wheel-drive vehicles

Cars introduced in 2002
Cars discontinued in 2011